Farm to Market Roads in Texas are owned and maintained by the Texas Department of Transportation (TxDOT).

FM 1500

Farm to Market Road 1500 (FM 1500) is located in Lamar County.

FM 1500 begins at an intersection with FM 79 northwest of Paris. The highway travels in a northern direction through rural areas and has an overlap with FM 1499 near the Emberson area. After the overlap, FM 1500 continues to run in a northern direction and starts to see more development along its route as it nears Pat Mayse Lake. State maintenance for the highway ends at the entrance for the Lamar Point Campground.

The highway was extended  northward on May 7, 1970, creating an overlap with FM 1499 in the process.

Junction list

FM 1501

Farm to Market Road 1501 (FM 1501) is located in Lamar County.

FM 1502

Farm to Market Road 1502 (FM 1502) is located in Lamar County.

FM 1503

Farm to Market Road 1503 (FM 1503) is located in Lamar County.

FM 1504

Farm to Market Road 1504 (FM 1504) is located in Van Zandt County.

FM 1505

Farm to Market Road 1505 (FM 1505) was located in El Paso County. No highway currently uses the FM 1505 designation.

FM 1505 was designated on September 28, 1949, from SH 20 (was US 80 before its rerouting off of this road; and its future truncation) to Trowbridge Drive. FM 1505 was also called Clark Drive. FM 1505 was decommissioned on May 24, 2018, and given to the city of El Paso.

FM 1506

Farm to Market Road 1506 (FM 1506) is located in Lamar County.

FM 1507

Farm to Market Road 1507 (FM 1507) is located in Lamar County.

FM 1508

Farm to Market Road 1508 (FM 1508) is located in Lamar County.

FM 1509

Farm to Market Road 1509 (FM 1509) is located in Lamar County.

FM 1510

Farm to Market Road 1510 (FM 1510) is located in Lamar County.

FM 1511

Farm to Market Road 1511 (FM 1511) is located in Leon County.

FM 1512

Farm to Market Road 1512 (FM 1512) is located in Leon County.

FM 1513

Farm to Market Road 1513 (FM 1513) is located in Rusk County.

FM 1514

Farm to Market Road 1514 (FM 1514) is located in San Jacinto County.

FM 1515

Farm to Market Road 1515 (FM 1515) is located in Denton County. Its western terminus is at the entrance to Denton Enterprise Airport. Its eastern terminus is at I-35E near the campus of the University of North Texas. The road is known locally as Airport Road and Bonnie Brae Street.

FM 1515 was designated on December 17, 1952, from the truck route of US 77 (now I-35E) west to the airport. On June 30, 1995, the road was transferred to Urban Road 1515 (UR 1515). The designation reverted to FM 1515 with the elimination of the Urban Road system on November 15, 2018.

Junction list

FM 1515 (1949)

FM 1515 was cancelled on December 17, 1952, and transferred to FM 236.

FM 1516

Farm to Market Road 1516 (FM 1516) is located in Bexar County. It runs from US 87 in China Grove to FM 1976 in Converse.

FM 1516 begins at an intersection with US 87 in China Grove, running through the town along Real Road. The highway exits China Grove before intersecting FM 1346 in Martinez. Just north of Martinez, FM 1516 briefly enters the city limits of San Antonio, where it meets I-10/US 90/SH 130. The highway enters Converse, intersecting FM 78 and Seguin Road (formerly FM 3502) before ending at an intersection with FM 1976.

FM 1516 was designated on September 28, 1949, from FM 78 near Converse southward  to China Grove School. On October 13, 1954, the road was extended south  to US 87. On March 12, 1963, the road was extended north  over the old location of FM 78. On May 22, 1979, the road was extended north to the FM 1976 spur connection. On December 30, 1988, a  section from FM 1516 southwest and northwest to FM 1976 was added, replacing a section of the FM 1976 spur connection (the remainder was renumbered FM 3502). On June 27, 1995, the section from FM 1976 to I-10 was transferred to Urban Road 1516 (UR 1516). The designation of this section reverted to FM 1516 with the elimination of the Urban Road system on November 15, 2018. On April 30, 2020, FM 1516 was rerouted onto a new road (Hilltop Avenue extension) from Seguin Road to FM 1976, while the old route on Gibbs Sprawl and Toepperwein Road was given to the city of Converse (along with FM 3502).

Junction list

FM 1517

Farm to Market Road 1517 (FM 1517) was located in Bexar County, running along Eckhert Road from 1949 to 2014.

The western terminus of FM 1517 was at an intersection with SH 16 (Bandera Road) in San Antonio, at the northern city limits of Leon Valley. The route traveled along Eckhert Road in a northeasterly direction, passing John Marshall High School before turning due east and ending at an intersection with Huebner Road. While the Eckhert Road name extended beyond both given termini, only the indicated portion was designated FM 1517.

The routing of FM 1517 was designated in 1949. It was redesignated as Urban Road 1517 (UR 1517) on June 27, 1995. The designation was canceled on December 18, 2014, and control was returned to the city of San Antonio as part of TxDOT's San Antonio turnback program, which gave 21.8 miles of roads to the city.

FM 1518

Farm to Market Road 1518 (FM 1518) is located in the Greater San Antonio area.

The southern terminus of FM 1518 is at a junction with Loop 1604 in the southeastern Bexar County town of Adkins. It continues north through the town of St. Hedwig and crosses Interstate 10 (I-10) at its exit 591. The route then passes to the east of Randolph Air Force Base before reaching FM 78 near Schertz, just west of the Guadalupe County line. Officially, FM 1518 is discontinuous here, and the route designation resumes at another point farther east along FM 78. Now in Guadalupe County, FM 1518 travels through the southwestern portion of Schertz and into Selma, where it ends at an intersection with I-35's exit 174A.

On April 21, 1953, the route was extended west  to Somerset. On May 25, 1953, the road was extended  to US 81 (now SH 132), replacing FM 1749. On November 21, 1956, FM 1518 was extended east to FM 1937. On August 8, 1958, FM 1518 was extended east to US 81(now I-35), replacing the section of FM 1937 from its current end to US 87. FM 1518 also replaced FM 1316 from US 90 to FM 78 and FM 1621 from FM 78 to US 81. On June 28, 1963, FM 1518 was extended west to FM 471, creating a route of approximately  that looped around the southwestern, southern, and eastern portions of the greater San Antonio area. On August 23, 1973, the section of FM 1518 from FM 471 to what is now Loop 1604 (then FM 2173) was renumbered as FM 2790 and the section from there to SH 16 became a portion of FM 1604 (now Loop 1604). On June 30, 1977, the section of FM 1518 from there to the current junction with Loop 1604 was transferred to Loop 1604. At that same time, FM 1604 was canceled and redesignated as Loop 1604, shortening FM 1518 to its current route. In 1995, the northern portion of FM 1518, from I-35 to FM 78 was officially redesignated as Urban Road 1518 (UR 1518); the designation reverted to FM 1518 with the elimination of the Urban Road system on November 15, 2018.

Junction list

FM 1519

Farm to Market Road 1519 (FM 1519) is located in Camp County. It runs from FM 556 southwest of Pittsburg to FM 1448.

FM 1519 was designated on September 28, 1949, from FM 556 southwest of Pittsburg west to SH 11 at Leesburg. On October 9, 1961, the road was extended to FM 1448, replacing FM 2680 and creating a concurrency with SH 11.

FM 1520

Farm to Market Road 1520 (FM 1520) is located in Camp County.

FM 1521

Farm to Market Road 1521 (FM 1521) is located in Camp County.

FM 1522

Farm to Market Road 1522 (FM 1522) is located in Camp County.

FM 1523

Farm to Market Road 1523 (FM 1523) is a  route in Culberson County. Its southern terminus is at a junction with US 90, near the abandoned community of Lobo. The route travels west to an intersection with FM 2017, which begins to the south while FM 1523 turns to the north. The route ends at another junction with US 90.

FM 1523 (1949)

The original FM 1523 was designated on September 28, 1949, from SH 11 at Newsome south to a road intersection. FM 1523 was eliminated on December 18, 1951, due to lack of funding.

FM 1524

Farm to Market Road 1524 (FM 1524) is located in Castro County.

FM 1525

Farm to Market Road 1525 (FM 1525) is located in Crosby County.

RM 1526

Ranch to Market Road 1526 (RM 1526) is located in Hutchinson County. It runs from SH 207/SH 136 (former SH 15) at Stinnett east to a county road.

RM 1526 was designated on October 31, 1958, on the current route.

FM 1526 (1949)

The first use of the FM 1526 designation was in Crosby County, from an intersection with FM 378, 2 miles north of Robertson, west to the Lubbock County line. FM 1526 was cancelled on December 29, 1949, and became part of FM 40.

FM 1526 (1957)

The second use of the FM 1526 designation was in Floyd County, from FM 2301 west to the Hale County line. FM 1526 was cancelled on March 18, 1958, and transferred to FM 2286.

FM 1527

Farm to Market Road 1527 (FM 1527) is located in Crosby County.

FM 1528

Farm to Market Road 1528 (FM 1528) is located in the western and central portions of Delta County. The roadway begins at an intersection with FM 64 in the community of Antioch. The highway proceeds southward, passing through the former community of Gough, before bending east. The highway proceeds east, running concurrently with SH 24 for a short distance. The road travels northeast, parallel to Cooper Lake, before bending north and entering Cooper, where it terminates at SH 154.

Early roads existed in the place of FM 1528 by 1936, and a short section of highway between SH 24 and Klondike was designated as Spur 39 on September 26, 1939, and FM 1528 was designated on September 28, 1949, replacing Spur 39. The route of the highway has been altered since its designation, including rerouting due to the construction of Cooper Lake.

FM 1529

Farm to Market Road 1529 (FM 1529) is located in Delta County.

FM 1530

Farm to Market Road 1530 (FM 1530) is located in Delta County.

FM 1531

Farm to Market Road 1531 (FM 1531) is located in Delta County.

FM 1532

Farm to Market Road 1532 (FM 1532) is located in Hunt and Delta counties.

FM 1533

Farm to Market Road 1533 (FM 1533) is located in Delta County.

FM 1534

Farm to Market Road 1534 (FM 1534) is located in Hill County, It runs from FM 933, 3 miles southeast of Whitney, northeast to FM 1947.

FM 1534 was designated on April 16, 1984, on the current route.

FM 1534 (1949)

The first use of the FM 1534 designation was in DeWitt County, from SH 119 3 miles north of Yorktown, northwest  via Gohlke School Road towards Nopal to a road intersection. FM 1534 was cancelled 12 months later and became a portion of FM 108.

FM 1534 (1958)

The second use of the FM 1534 designation was in Hale County, from SH 194 at Edmonson north to the Swisher County line. FM 1534 was cancelled on October 7, 1960, and transferred to FM 2355. On October 10, 1961, FM 2355 was cancelled and transferred to FM 1424.

RM 1534

The third use of the FM 1534 designation was as RM 1534 in Kimble County, from US 290, 9.7 miles northwest of the Kerr County line, east . RM 1534 was cancelled on December 8, 1981, and became a portion of RM 479.

FM 1535

Farm to Market Road 1535 (FM 1535) is a  route in Bexar County. It is known in Greater San Antonio as Northwest Military Highway.

FM 1535 begins at Interstate 410 in Castle Hills. The route travels north through north central San Antonio, crossing Wurzbach Parkway, and into Shavano Park, where it has a junction with Loop 1604. FM 1535 ends at the San Antonio city limits, at the entrance to the Camp Bullis Military Training Reservation.

FM 1535 was designated on October 15, 1955. Its designation was officially changed to Urban Road 1535 (UR 1535) on June 27, 1995. In 2003, the route was designated the Second Indian Head Division Memorial Highway, in honor of the 2nd Infantry Division of the U.S. Army. The designation reverted to FM 1535 with the elimination of the Urban Road system on November 15, 2018. The sections of FM 1535 from Lockhill-Selma Road (at the Castle Hills city limit boundary) to the Shavano Park city limit boundary and from Loop 1604 to the Camp Bullis were proposed for decommissioning (one section of FM 1535 would have been renumbered) in 2014 as part of TxDOT's San Antonio turnback proposal, which would have relinquished jurisdiction of over 129 miles of roads to the city of San Antonio; however, the city rejected that proposal.

Junction list

FM 1535 (1949)

The original FM 1535 was designated on September 28, 1949, from FM 80 south of Teague west and south to a road intersection. FM 1535 was cancelled on April 13, 1955, due to lack of funding.

FM 1536

Farm to Market Road 1536 (FM 1536) is located in Hopkins County.

FM 1537

Farm to Market Road 1537 (FM 1537) is located in Hopkins County.

FM 1538

Farm to Market Road 1538 (FM 1538) is located in Jim Wells County.

FM 1539

Farm to Market Road 1539 (FM 1539) is located in Jim Wells County.

FM 1540

Farm to Market Road 1540 (FM 1540) is located in Jim Wells County.

FM 1541

Farm to Market Road 1541 (FM 1541) is located in Randall County.

FM 1541 begins at I-27 and Cemetery Road near Canyon. The highway travels north and intersects SH 217 and FM 3331 just east of Canyon. FM 1541 runs in a generally north direction through Randall County, passing near several subdivisions. The highway has an interchange at Loop 335 before entering the city limits of Amarillo near SW 58th Street. FM 1541 is known locally as Washington Street in the city and runs through a heavily developed area before ending at I-27/US 60/US 87.

FM 1541 was first designated on September 28, 1949, running southward  from US 60/US 87 to road intersection. On December 18, 1951, the highway was extended further south to SH 217 near Canyon. On November 29, 1957, FM 1541 was extended further south to FM 285, absorbing FM 2390 in the process. A year later, the highway was extended southward again to the Randall-Swisher county line at what is now FM 1075. On February 14, 1991, FM 1541's southern terminus was truncated to I-27 southeast of Canyon with a spur connection to SH 217 being added. On June 27, 1995, the section from Loop 335 to I-27/US 60/US 87 was redesignated Urban Road 1541 (UR 1541). The designation reverted to FM 1541 with the elimination of the Urban Road system on November 15, 2018.

Junction list

FM 1542

Farm to Market Road 1542 (FM 1542) is located in Parker and Tarrant counties.

FM 1543

Farm to Market Road 1543 (FM 1543) is located in Hood County.

FM 1544

Farm to Market Road 1544 (FM 1544) is located in Nolan County. It runs from FM 419 in Sweetwater west and south to Business I-20 (formerly Loop 432).

FM 1544 was designated on September 26, 1979, on the current route.

FM 1544 (1949)

The first route numbered FM 1544 was designated in Parker County on September 28, 1949, from US 180 north to Garner. FM 1544 was cancelled on December 17, 1952, and transferred to FM 113.

FM 1544 (1952)

On May 25, 1976, the road was extended north  to US 82/US 380. FM 1544 was cancelled on September 15, 1976, and became a portion of FM 1780.

FM 1545

Farm to Market Road 1545 (FM 1545) is located in Live Oak County. It runs from SH 72, 3 miles west of US 281 in Three Rivers, southeast, southwest and north to SH 72.

FM 1545 was designated on May 6, 1964, from SH 72, 3 miles west of US 281 in Three Rivers, southeast and southwest . On October 26, 1983, the road was extended north 1 mile to SH 72.

FM 1545 (1949)

The original FM 1545 was designated on September 28, 1949, from US 80 (now I-20) south  to Anneta. FM 1545 was cancelled on August 1, 1963, and transferred to FM 5.

FM 1546

Farm to Market Road 1546 (FM 1546) is located in Kleberg County.

FM 1547

Farm to Market Road 1547 (FM 1547) is located in Wheeler, Collingsworth and Hall counties.

FM 1548

Farm to Market Road 1548 (FM 1548) is located in Collingsworth County.

FM 1549

Farm to Market Road 1549 (FM 1549) is located in Atascosa and Frio counties.

FM 1550

Farm to Market Road 1550 (FM 1550) is located in Fannin County.

FM 1551

Farm to Market Road 1551 (FM 1551) is located in Hutchinson County.

FM 1551 (1949)

The original FM 1551 was designated on October 26, 1949, from SH 78 to the Fannin-Hunt county line. A month later FM 1551 was cancelled and became a portion of FM 816.

FM 1552

Farm to Market Road 1552 (FM 1552) is located in Fannin County.

FM 1553

Farm to Market Road 1553 (FM 1553) is located in Fannin County.

FM 1554

Farm to Market Road 1554 (FM 1554) is located in Jim Wells County.

RM 1555

Ranch to Market Road 1555 (RM 1555) is located in Upton and Reagan counties.

RM 1555 begins at an intersection with SH 349 north of Rankin. The highway runs in a slight northeast direction through rural areas of Upton County, passing the Atlas Pipeline. RM 1555 has an intersection with RM 2594 before entering Reagan County. At the Upton–Reagan county line, the highway turns at a nearly 90-degree angle and begins to run in a southeast direction. South of Jackson Lane, RM 1555 travels in a southward direction to its terminus at US 67 near Texon.

RM 1555 was designated on October 26, 1949, as Farm to Market Road 1555 (FM 1555) and ran northwest from US 67 to the Upton–Reagan county line. The designated was changed from FM to RM on January 16, 1960.

FM 1556

Farm to Market Road 1556 (FM 1556) is located in Dimmit County.

FM 1557

Farm to Market Road 1557 (FM 1557) is located in Dimmit County.

FM 1558

Farm to Market Road 1558 (FM 1558) is located in Dimmit County.

FM 1559

Farm to Market Road 1559 (FM 1559) is located in Hutchinson County.

FM 1559 (1946)

The original FM 1559 was designated on December 10, 1946, from Orange north  to Lemonville Road. This was formerly a section of SH 87 before it was rerouted east over FM 407. FM 1559 was cancelled on January 16, 1950, and became a portion of FM 1130.

FM 1560

Farm to Market Road 1560 (FM 1560) is located in the Greater San Antonio area. The highway runs from FM 471 in extreme west San Antonio to Loop 1604 near the main campus of UTSA.

FM 1560 begins at an intersection with FM 471 in western San Antonio, near Loop 1604. The highway runs through rural areas of Bexar County to SH 16 in Helotes. The two highways share a short wrong way concurrency. After leaving SH 16, FM 1560, now signed as Hausman Road, travels through the northern part of Helotes, passing by many subdivisions. The highway turns to the east, before ending at Loop 1604, near UTSA.

The section of highway between SH 16 and Loop 1604 is usually used as a cut-off route for traffic traveling to places along Loop 1604 in the northern part of the city.

The current route of FM 1560 opened on September 21, 1955. The highway ran from FM 471 to a county road in Bexar County. The highway was shortened back to Loop 1604 on June 30, 1977. The section from Loop 1604 west to Helotes city limit will be removed from the state highway system upon issuance of the Project Acceptance Letter for project CSJ 2230-01-013, per a December 18, 2014, minute order as part of TxDOT's San Antonio turnback program, which gave 21.8 miles of roads to the city.

The intersections with SH 16 in Helotes are currently being upgraded as that highway is being converted into a superstreet.

Junction list

FM 1560 (1949)

The original FM 1560 was designated on November 30, 1949, from SH 34 to FM 824. FM 1560 was cancelled on October 15, 1954, and became a portion of FM 1550.

FM 1561

Farm to Market Road 1561 (FM 1561) is located in Cameron County.

FM 1561 was designated on June 1, 1965, on the current route.

FM 1561 (1949)

The first route numbered FM 1561 was designated in Hidalgo County on November 30, 1949, from FM 681 at McCook west to the Starr County line. On November 20, 1951, the road was extended westward into Starr County by  FM 755. FM 1561 was cancelled on February 15, 1958, and transferred to FM 490.

FM 1561 (1958)

The second route numbered FM 1561 was designated in Brazoria County on October 31, 1958, from FM 523 at Stratton Ridge northeast . On January 1, 1960, the road was extended northeast  to Danbury Road. On May 30, 1961, the original routing was cancelled and FM 1561 was reassigned on a route in Brazoria and Galveston counties, from SH 288 to SH 6, replacing a section of FM 646. FM 1561 was cancelled on October 15, 1964; the section from SH 6 at Alta Loma south  was transferred to FM 646, and the section from that point south of SH 6 to SH 288 was transferred to FM 2004.

FM 1562

Farm to Market Road 1562 (FM 1562) is located in Collin and Hunt counties.

FM 1562 begins at an intersection with FM 981 east of Blue Ridge. The highway travels in a mostly eastern direction, intersecting FM 36, before ending at an intersection with US 69 in Celeste.

The highway was extended  westward to FM 981 on November 26, 1954.

FM 1563

Farm to Market Road 1563 (FM 1563) is located in Hunt County.

FM 1564

Farm to Market Road 1564 (FM 1564) is located south of Greenville in unincorporated Hunt County.

After separating from SH 34 and continuing to the east, the route crosses FM 2101, which provides access to Majors Airport to the north. FM 1564 ends at a junction with US 69. FM 1564 is two lanes for its entire length, and primarily serves agricultural traffic, but it is also used by recreational traffic bound for the northern shore of Lake Tawakoni.

FM 1564 was first designated on November 30, 1949, along what is now its eastern section, from SH 34 to US 69 south of the community of Dixon. The westward extension from SH 34 to FM 36 was approved on June 2, 1967.

Junction list

FM 1565

Farm to Market Road 1565 (FM 1565) is located in Hunt and Kaufman counties.

FM 1566

Farm to Market Road 1566 (FM 1566) is located in Hunt County.

FM 1567

Farm to Market Road 1567 (FM 1567) is located in Hunt and Hopkins counties.

FM 1568

Farm to Market Road 1568 (FM 1568) is located in Hunt County.

FM 1569

Farm to Market Road 1569 (FM 1569) is located in Hunt County.

FM 1570

Farm to Market Road 1570 (FM 1570) is a major thoroughfare located in Hunt County, roughly along the city limits of Greenville.

The road has two lanes and  shoulders between SH 34 and SH 66. There are only 4 traffic signals on its entire length, making it the preferred route for Dallas/Fort Worth-bound commuters attempting to avoid local traffic within Greenville.

FM 1570 was designated on November 30, 1949, from SH 34 south of Greenville east  to Majors Air Field. This route was formerly War Highway 20. On March 5, 1959, the road was extended north to US 69, replacing FM 2298. On January 15, 1963, the road was extended southwest to I-30. On August 19, 1964, the road was extended north to SH 66, replacing FM 2032. An extension from SH 66 north to US 380 called Spur 1570 was opened in December 2018. In addition, FM 3211 was realigned to end at the extension rather than at US 380.

Junction list

FM 1571

Farm to Market Road 1571 (FM 1571) is located in Hunt County.

FM 1572

Farm to Market Road 1572 (FM 1572) is located in Kinney County.

FM 1572 (1949)

The original FM 1572 was designated on November 30, 1949, from US 80 in Sweetwater north  to the Nolan–Fisher county line. The highway was extended  miles north into Fisher County to a road intersection on May 23, 1951. FM 1572 was cancelled on October 28, 1953, and transferred to FM 419.

FM 1573

Farm to Market Road 1573 (FM 1573) is located in Sherman and Hansford counties.

FM 1574

Farm to Market Road 1574 (FM 1574) is located in Uvalde County.

FM 1574 (1949)

The original FM 1574 was designated on December 29, 1949, from SH 21 northwest 4.6 miles to the town of Gus. FM 1574 was cancelled on June 11, 1965, and became a portion of FM 696.

FM 1575

Farm to Market Road 1575 (FM 1575) is located in Cameron County. It begins at an intersection with SH 100 near Los Fresnos. The highway runs north through unincorporated areas of the county before entering Laureles, where it has an intersection with FM 2893 before ending at FM 510.

FM 1575 was designated on December 29, 1949, on its current route.

FM 1576

Farm to Market Road 1576 (FM 1576) is a  route in Hudspeth County. Its southern terminus is at US 62/US 180 near the ghost town of Salt Flat. It runs northward, intersecting FM 2249, before ending at the New Mexico state line. The roadway continues as Otero County Road G-005.

FM 1576 was designated on September 18, 1957, from the mileage of FM 2318 and a section of FM 2249. The renumbering from FM 2318 was necessary because there was already a route in Bosque County with that number. On September 27, 1960, the mileage of FM 2636 was transferred to FM 1576, extending it to US 62/US 180. On September 5, 1973, it was extended to its current northern terminus.

FM 1576 (1949)

The original FM 1576 was designated on December 29, 1949, from SH 4 northeast of Brownsville southwest  to FM 1419. FM 1576 was cancelled on April 30, 1956, and transferred to SH 4.

FM 1577

Farm to Market Road 1577 (FM 1577) is located in Cameron County.

FM 1578

Farm to Market Road 1578 (FM 1578) is located in Navarro County.

FM 1578 (1949)

The original FM 1578 was designated on December 29, 1949, from FM 769 north   to a road intersection. FM 1578 was cancelled on March 25, 1961, and transferred to FM 1169.

FM 1579

Farm to Market Road 1579 (FM 1579) is located in Fayette County.

FM 1580

Farm to Market Road 1580 (FM 1580) is located in Freestone County.

FM 1581

Farm to Market Road 1581 (FM 1581) is located in Frio County. Its southern terminus is at FM 117 near the community of Divot. The highway runs northeast through unincorporated Frio County and enters Pearsall, intersecting I-35 at exit 99. From here, FM 1581 runs concurrently with Business I-35 to an intersection with FM 140, where the FM 1581 designation ends.

FM 1581 was designated on December 29, 1949, from FM 1465 (now FM 140) southwest on Oil Field Road . It was extended to its current southern terminus at FM 117 near Divot on November 24, 1959.

FM 1582

Farm to Market Road 1582 (FM 1582) runs from Spur 581 in Pearsall to SH 97 between Charlotte and Fowlerton.

FM 1582 begins at an intersection with Spur 581 in southern Pearsall. FM 1582 briefly enters La Salle County before entering McMullen County, where it ends at an intersection with SH 97.

FM 1582 was designated on December 29, 1949, running from US 81 (now Spur 581) to a road intersection near the current location of SH 85. On December 19, 1958, the highway was extended further southeast to its current terminus at SH 97.

FM 1583

Farm to Market Road 1583 (FM 1583) is located in Frio County.

FM 1583 begins at I-35/Spur 581 in Derby, with the road continuing west as County Road 4427. The highway runs southeast through rural and unincorporated areas of Frio County before ending at an intersection with SH 85.

FM 1584

Farm to Market Road 1584 (FM 1584) runs from US 87 north of Big Spring to US 87 near Ackerly.

FM 1584 begins at an intersection with US 87 just north of Big Spring. The highway runs in a generally north direction, intersecting FM 846 before intersecting FM 1785 in Vealmoor. North of Vealmoor, FM 1584 briefly enters Borden County where it turns left to the west at Vealmoore Road, turns back to the north at County Road 239, and back to the west at County Road 236. The highway enters Dawson County before ending at US 87 near Ackerly.

FM 1584 was designated on December 29, 1949, running north from US 87 to the Howard-Borden county line north of Vealmoor. On November 20, 1951, the highway was extended north and west to the Borden-Dawson county line. On August 20, 1952, FM 1584 was extended west to its current terminus at US 87 near Ackerly.

Junction list

FM 1585

Farm to Market Road 1585 (FM 1585) is located in the South Plains region of Texas. The section of highway between U.S. Highway 62/U.S. Highway 82 (US 62/US 82) and US 87 has seen rapid growth along its route in the past few years, as Lubbock expands southward.

FM 1585 begins at an intersection with FM 769 at the Texas-New Mexico state line, south of Bledsoe. The highway travels through rural areas of Cochran County, intersecting with SH 214. FM 1585 shares a short overlap with FM 1780 before entering into Hockley County. The highway shares another overlap, this time with FM 300, southwest of Levelland. FM 1585 intersects with US 385 south of Levelland, maintaining its rural route. Crossing into Lubbock County, FM 1585 shares a short overlap with US 62/US 82 southwest of Wolfforth. A few miles east of here, FM 1585 enters into the city of Lubbock, running along the southernmost boundary of the city. The highway leaves the Lubbock city limits just west of the US 87 intersection. East of US 87, FM 1585 becomes a rural route once again, ending at an intersection with US 84 just north of Slaton.

On January 18, 1952, FM 1585 was extended east  to US 84. On November 21, 1956, FM 1585 was extended west  to US 62. On November 21, 1957, FM 1585 was extended west to FM 300 (now FM 303), replacing FM 2010. On July 11, 1968, FM 1585 was extended west to FM 1780. On May 18, 1970, FM 1585 was extended west to FM 769, replacing FM 3024.

The section of FM 1585 between US 62/US 82 near Wolfforth and US 84 near Slaton will become a part of the future Loop 88.

Junction list

FM 1586

Farm to Market Road 1586 (FM 1586) is located in Gonzales County.

FM 1587

Farm to Market Road 1587 (FM 1587) was located in Knox and Haskell counties. No highway currently uses the FM 1587 designation.

FM 1587 was designated on January 27, 1950, running southeast from US 277 to the Knox-Haskell county line. On July 28, 1955, the highway was extended further southeast another  to FM 1720. On May 24, 1962, the section from FM 266 south 3.5 miles was transferred to FM 266. On September 5, 1973, FM 1587 was signed (but not designated) as part of SH 222. FM 1587 was cancelled on August 29, 1990, as the SH 222 designation became official.

FM 1588

Farm to Market Road 1588 (FM 1588) is located in Maverick County.

FM 1589

Farm to Market Road 1589 (FM 1589) is located in Maverick County.

FM 1590

Farm to Market Road 1590 (FM 1590) is located in Maverick County.

FM 1591

Farm to Market Road 1591 (FM 1591) is located in Maverick County.

FM 1592

Farm to Market Road 1592 (FM 1592) is located in Sabine County.

FM 1593

Farm to Market Road 1593 (FM 1593) is located in Jackson and Calhoun counties.

FM 1594

Farm to Market Road 1594 (FM 1594) is located in Foard County.

FM 1595

Farm to Market Road 1595 (FM 1595) is located in Cameron County.

FM 1596

Farm to Market Road 1596 (FM 1596) is located in Live Oak County.

FM 1597

Farm to Market Road 1597 (FM 1597) is located in Jones County.

FM 1597 begins at an intersection with FM 600 west of Lueders. The highway travels in an eastern direction and enters Leuders. FM 1597 turns northeast at Herrick Street before ending at an intersection with SH 6.

The current FM 1597 was designated on July 28, 1955, running from FM 1193 (now FM 600) to US 380 (now SH 6).

FM 1597 (1950)

FM 1597 was first designated on April 28, 1950, running from FM 275 at Miller Grove eastward  to a county road. On May 23, 1951, the highway was extended further east to SH 19. FM 1597 was cancelled on December 17, 1952, with the mileage being transferred to FM 1567.

FM 1597 (1952)

The second use of the FM 1597 designation was in Colorado County, from FM 102 (now US 90A) in Eagle Lake northeastward 5.9 miles to a road intersection. The highway was extended to the Wharton county line on February 24, 1953, replacing FM 1694. FM 1597 was cancelled on November 5, 1954, and transferred to FM 1093.

FM 1598

Farm to Market Road 1598 (FM 1598) is located in Moore and Hutchinson counties.

FM 1599

Farm to Market Road 1599 (FM 1599) is located in Cameron County.

Notes

References

+15
Farm to market roads 1500
Farm to Market Roads 1500